Anastathma are a genus of moths, belonging to the family  Tineidae.

References

Tineidae
Tineidae genera